Karin Suter-Erath (born 24 November 1970) is a Swiss para badminton player and a former wheelchair tennis player.

Suter-Erath was a very keen handball and soccer player when aged 13 and played in European handball leagues from the ages of 17 to 27. She studied physical education at university and became a secondary school teacher once she graduated.

In 1997, Suter-Erath was paralysed from the waist down in an accident which caused her to stop playing handball. While in rehab in Nottwil, she tried out wheelchair tennis and when she completed her rehab then she took the sport up professionally. In 2004, Suter-Erath teamed up with Sandra Kalt and competed in the 2004 Summer Paralympics and won their first ever Paralympic medal in the women's doubles. From 2005 to 2007, she reached to world number six and was voted as Basel's Athlete of the Year alongside Roger Federer and FC Basel a year later.

As well as being very successful in wheelchair tennis, she took up para badminton and won a silver medal in the women's doubles at the 2010 Para Badminton European Championships in Manchester then won eight medals in the BWF Para-Badminton World Championships and twelve medals in the European championships.

Wheelchair tennis statistics

Paralympic Games

Para-badminton statistics

World Championships 

Women's singles

Women's doubles

Mixed doubles

References

External links
 
 

1970 births
Living people
People with paraplegia
Swiss female badminton players
Swiss para-badminton players
Swiss female tennis players
Wheelchair tennis players
Paralympic badminton players of Switzerland
Paralympic wheelchair tennis players of Switzerland
Paralympic medalists in wheelchair tennis
Paralympic bronze medalists for Switzerland
Wheelchair tennis players at the 2004 Summer Paralympics
Medalists at the 2004 Summer Paralympics
Badminton players at the 2020 Summer Paralympics
Sportspeople from Basel-Stadt
21st-century Swiss women